The genus Nannaria, commonly known as twisted-claw millipedes, is a genus of millipedes in the family Xystodesmidae first described by Ralph Chamberlin in 1918. In 2022, entomologists Derek Hennen, Jackson Means and Paul Marek discovered and described 17 new species, which expanded the size of Nannaria to 78, making it the largest genus of Xystodesmidae.

Species
These 78 species belong to the genus Nannaria:

 Nannaria acroteria Hennen, Means & Marek, 2022
 Nannaria aenigma Means, Hennen & Marek, 2021
 Nannaria alpina Means, Hennen & Marek, 2021
 Nannaria ambulatrix Means, Hennen & Marek, 2021
 Nannaria amicalola Hennen, Means & Marek, 2022
 Nannaria antarctica Hennen, Means & Marek, 2022
 Nannaria asta Means, Hennen & Marek, 2021
 Nannaria austricola Hoffman, 1950
 Nannaria blackmountainensis Means, Hennen & Marek, 2021
 Nannaria bobmareki Means, Hennen & Marek, 2021
 Nannaria botrydium Means, Hennen & Marek, 2021
 Nannaria breweri Means, Hennen & Marek, 2021
 Nannaria castanea (McNeill, 1887)
 Nannaria castra Means, Hennen & Marek, 2021
 Nannaria caverna Means, Hennen & Marek, 2021
 Nannaria cingulata Means, Hennen & Marek, 2021
 Nannaria conservata Chamberlin, 1940
 Nannaria cryomaia Means, Hennen & Marek, 2021
 Nannaria cymontana Hennen, Means & Marek, 2022
 Nannaria daptria Means, Hennen & Marek, 2021
 Nannaria davidcauseyi Causey, 1950
 Nannaria dilatata (Hennen & Shelley, 2015)
 Nannaria domestica Shelley, 1975
 Nannaria equalis Chamberlin, 1949
 Nannaria ericacea Hoffman, 1949
 Nannaria filicata Hennen, Means & Marek, 2022
 Nannaria fowleri Chamberlin, 1947
 Nannaria fracta Means, Hennen & Marek, 2021
 Nannaria fritzae Means, Hennen & Marek, 2021
 Nannaria hardeni Means, Hennen & Marek, 2021
 Nannaria hippopotamus Means, Hennen & Marek, 2021
 Nannaria hokie Means, Hennen & Marek, 2021
 Nannaria honeytreetrailensis Means, Hennen & Marek, 2021
 Nannaria ignis Means, Hennen & Marek, 2021
 Nannaria kassoni Means, Hennen & Marek, 2021
 Nannaria komela Means, Hennen & Marek, 2021
 Nannaria laminata Hoffman, 1949
 Nannaria liriodendra Hennen, Means & Marek, 2022
 Nannaria lithographa Hennen, Means & Marek, 2022
 Nannaria lutra Hennen, Means & Marek, 2022
 Nannaria marianae Hennen, Means & Marek, 2022
 Nannaria mcelroyorum Means, Hennen & Marek, 2021
 Nannaria minor Chamberlin, 1918
 Nannaria missouriensis Chamberlin, 1928
 Nannaria monsdomia Means, Hennen & Marek, 2021
 Nannaria morrisoni Hoffman, 1948
 Nannaria nessa Hennen, Means & Marek, 2022
 Nannaria oblonga (Koch, 1847)
 Nannaria ohionis Loomis & Hoffman, 1948
 Nannaria orycta Hennen, Means & Marek, 2022
 Nannaria paraptoma Hennen, Means & Marek, 2022
 Nannaria paupertas Means, Hennen & Marek, 2021
 Nannaria piccolia Means, Hennen & Marek, 2021
 Nannaria rhododendra Hennen, Means & Marek, 2022
 Nannaria rhysodesmoides (Hennen & Shelley, 2015)
 Nannaria rutherfordensis Shelley, 1975
 Nannaria scholastica Means, Hennen & Marek, 2021
 Nannaria scutellaria Causey, 1942
 Nannaria serpens Means, Hennen & Marek, 2021
 Nannaria sheari Means, Hennen & Marek, 2021
 Nannaria shenandoa Hoffman, 1949
 Nannaria sigmoidea (Hennen & Shelley, 2015)
 Nannaria simplex Hoffman, 1949
 Nannaria solenas Means, Hennen & Marek, 2021
 Nannaria spalax Hennen, Means & Marek, 2022
 Nannaria spiralis Hennen, Means & Marek, 2022
 Nannaria spruilli Means, Hennen & Marek, 2021
 Nannaria stellapolis Means, Hennen & Marek, 2021
 Nannaria stellaradix Means, Hennen & Marek, 2021
 Nannaria suprema Means, Hennen & Marek, 2021
 Nannaria swiftae Hennen, Means & Marek, 2022
 Nannaria tasskelsoae Means, Hennen & Marek, 2021
 Nannaria tennesseensis (Bollman, 1888)
 Nannaria tenuis Means, Hennen & Marek, 2021
 Nannaria terricola (Williams & Hefner, 1928)
 Nannaria tsuga Means, Hennen & Marek, 2021
 Nannaria vellicata Hennen, Means & Marek, 2022
 Nannaria wilsoni Hoffman, 1949

References

Further reading

 
 

Polydesmida
Myriapod genera
Taxa named by Ralph Vary Chamberlin
Articles created by Qbugbot